Bolotridon is an extinct genus of epicynodontian cynodont. It was renamed from its original genus designation of Tribolodon (Harry Govier Seeley, 1895), which was already occupied by a genus of cyprinid fish named in 1883 by Sauvage. The name Bolotridon was coined by Brian W. Coad in a 1977 publication as an anagram of Tribolodon.

Fossils of the genus were found in the Anisian Cynognathus Assemblage Zone of the Burgersdorp Formation of South Africa.

See also
 List of therapsids

References

External links
 The main groups of non-mammalian synapsids at Mikko's Phylogeny Archive

Prehistoric cynodont genera
Anisian life
Middle Triassic synapsids of Africa
Triassic South Africa
Fossils of South Africa
Taxa named by Brian W. Coad
Fossil taxa described in 1977